Events from the year 1648 in France

Incumbents
 Monarch – Louis XIV
Regent: Anne of Austria

Events

23 March – Treaty of Concordia
17 May – Battle of Zusmarshausen
20 August – Battle of Lens

Births
5 August – Guichard Joseph Duverney, anatomist (died 1730)

Deaths

Full date missing
François de Cauvigny de Colomby, poet, translator and King's counsellor (born c.1588)
Vincent Voiture, writer (born 1597)
Isaac de Caus, architect and landscaper (born 1590)
Marin Mersenne, philosopher, mathematician and music theorist, "father of acoustics" (born 1588)

See also

References

1640s in France